Japanese idol group Sakura Gakuin has released eleven studio albums, one compilation album, fifteen video albums, thirty-four music videos, and thirteen singles. Seven more singles and nine more music videos have been released by sub-units, including those by the band Babymetal released prior to March 2013. Studio albums are released annually, under the supertitle .

Studio albums

Sakura Gakuin 2010 Nendo: Message 

 is the debut studio album by Sakura Gakuin. It charted at number 54 on the Oricon weekly chart. The album was scheduled for release on March 23, 2011, but was postponed due to the March 11 earthquake and tsunami.

"Yume ni Mukatte" / "Hello! Ivy" was released as the lead single on December 8, 2010. "Hello! Ivy" served as a collaboration song with Mono Comme Ça stores in Japan. The group performed at Tower Records Shinjuku on April 30 to commemorate the album release.

"Dear Mr. Socrates" was released as a single by the Baton Club Twinklestars on November 28, 2010. The album marks the first appearance of the aforementioned sub-unit, as well as the Cooking Club Mini-Pati, the Go Home Club Sleepiece, and the Heavy Music Club Babymetal, as well as the only appearance for the Newspaper Club Scoopers. "Doki Doki ☆ Morning" would later be released as a DVD single on October 22, 2011.

Notes
 "Fly Away", "Hello! Ivy", and "Message" are stylized as "FLY AWAY", "Hello! IVY", and "message", respectively.
 "Princess ☆ à la Mode" is excluded from limited edition releases.
 "Medaka no Kyōdai" is a cover of the 1982 Warabe song of the same name.

Sakura Gakuin 2011 Nendo: Friends 

 is the second studio album by Sakura Gakuin. It charted at number 56 on the Oricon weekly chart, lasting two weeks.

"Verishuvi" was released as the lead single on December 21, 2011. The word comes from the phrase "very very shooby dooba", deriving from words used in scat singing, while the song title means "very happy". "Tabidachi no Hi ni" is a traditional graduation song written in 1991, and was released as the graduation single on March 7, 2012. "Friends" was first performed at the concert Sakura Gakuin 2011 Nendo New: Departure and later released as a single. After leaving the group, Ayami Mutō would later cover the song during her A.Y.M Ballads concert in August 2014.

Notes
 "Friends" is stylized as "FRIENDS".
 "Hashire Shōjiki-mono" is a cover of the 1991 Hideki Saijō song of the same name.

Sakura Gakuin 2012 Nendo: My Generation 

 is the third studio album by Sakura Gakuin. It charted at number 39 on the Oricon weekly chart, lasting two weeks.

"Wonderful Journey" was released as the lead single on September 5, 2012. With the theme of countries around the world, the song makes references to France, Ecuador, Jamaica, and Costa Rica; the latter includes a comparison between the names of member Raura Iida and former President Laura Chinchilla. "My Graduation Toss" was released as the graduation single on February 27, 2013. Suzuka Nakamoto praised Tommy Heavenly6 after the single's release, noting its sympathetic feel for graduation in rock style.

Notes
 "Wonderful Journey" is stylized as "WONDERFUL JOURNEY".
 "Suimin Busoku" is a cover of the 1990 Chicks song of the same name, serving as an opening theme for the anime adaptation of Kiteretsu Daihyakka.

Sakura Gakuin 2013 Nendo: Kizuna 

 is the fourth studio album by Sakura Gakuin. It charted at number 29 on the Oricon weekly chart, lasting two weeks.

"Ganbare!!" was released as the lead single on October 9, 2013. The title is written unconventionally with the kanji for face (顔) and smile (笑), as the Principal of Sakura Gakuin, Mitsuru Kuramoto stated that the standard word (頑張れ) has a connotation of pressure. The second single, "Jump Up (Chiisana Yūki)" was released on February 12, 2014. One of the B-sides is a cover of the Monkees single "Daydream Believer".

Notes
 "Hana Hana" and "IJI" are stylized as "Hana*Hana" and "I・J・I", respectively.

Sakura Gakuin 2014 Nendo: Kimi ni Todoke 

 is the fifth studio album by Sakura Gakuin. It charted at number 18 on the Oricon weekly chart, lasting two weeks.

"Heart no Hoshi" was released as the lead single on October 15, 2014, and as a DVD single on October 22, 2014. The name comes from the words "heart" and "earth", which share successive letters, expressing the song's message that once everyone's hearts are joined on Earth, the people are united; the Japanese title also uses an alternative reading of the word "earth". After its release, writers Tomoko Kawase and Shunsaku Okuda released a demo of the song. "Aogeba Tōtoshi (from Sakura Gakuin 2014)" was released as the graduation single on February 25, 2015, and as a DVD single on March 4, 2015. Due to the archaic nature of the original lyrics, the meaning was difficult to interpret. During the group's live events, the members made their own interpretations of the song.

Sakura Gakuin 2015 Nendo: Kirameki no Kakera 

 is the sixth studio album by Sakura Gakuin. It charted at number 15 on the Oricon weekly chart.

"Mathematica!" was released as the seventh "educational song", with its music video first released as a DVD bonus of the September 2015 issue of Ciao. "School Days (2015)" was rerecorded and released as a DVD single, with a music video (and choreography cut) along with footage from live performances at Tokyo Idol Festival 2015 on August 2, 2015.

Sakura Gakuin 2016 Nendo: Yakusoku 

 is the seventh studio album by Sakura Gakuin. It charted at number 18 on the Oricon weekly chart. Five of the songs have been re-recorded and rearranged by Dr.StrangeLove member Takamune Negishi, with Negishi on bass, Maseeeta on drums, Naoki Hayashibe on guitar, and Yasuhiro Nozaki on keyboard.

"Melodic Solfége" was released as the lead single on September 17, 2016. The song's theme is classical music, and contains elements of Beethoven's "Für Elise" among other classical pieces.

Notes
 The pre-release track listing had the positions switched for "Marshmallow-iro no Kimi to" and "Otomegokoro".

Sakura Gakuin 2017 Nendo: My Road 

 is the eighth studio album by Sakura Gakuin. Three songs have been re-recorded. The album charted at number sixteen on the Oricon weekly album chart for the week March 12, 2018 with first-week sales of 4,226 copies.

Notes
 The pre-release contained an alternative track listing.

Sakura Gakuin 2018 Nendo: Life Iro Asenai Hibi 

 is the ninth studio album by Sakura Gakuin.

Sakura Gakuin 2019 Nendo: Story 

 is the tenth studio album by Sakura Gakuin.

Sakura Gakuin 2020 Nendo: Thank You 

 is the eleventh and final studio album by Sakura Gakuin.

Compilation albums

Hōkago Anthology from Sakura Gakuin

 is a compilation album by Sakura Gakuin, containing only songs performed by sub-units. It charted at number 96 on the Oricon weekly chart.

Video albums

Singles

Main group

Twinklestars

Babymetal

Kagaku Kyumei Kikoh Logica?

Music videos

References

External links
 Official discography
 
 
 

Discographies of Japanese artists
Discography